The Randy Newman Songbook Vol. 2 contains newly recorded, stripped-down versions of some of Newman's best known songs, performed by Randy Newman singing and playing the piano without accompaniment.

Track listing
All tracks composed and arranged by Randy Newman

"Dixie Flyer"
"Yellow Man" 
"Suzanne" 
"The Girls in My Life, Pt. 1" 
"Kingfish" 
"Losing You" 
"Sandman's Coming" 
"My Life Is Good" 
"Birmingham" 
"Last Night I Had a Dream" 
"Same Girl" 
"Baltimore" 
"Laugh and Be Happy" 
"Lucinda" 
"Dayton, Ohio, 1903" 
"Cowboy"

Personnel
Randy Newman – vocals, piano

References

2011 albums
Randy Newman albums
Albums produced by Lenny Waronker
Albums produced by Mitchell Froom
Nonesuch Records albums